= DOC (website) =

- Website type: Professional networking service
- Available in: English
- Website: www.docjobs.com
- Commercial: Yes
- Registration: Required
- Users: >40,000
- Launched: 1999
- Current status: Active

DOC (also known as DOC Jobs or Drop Out Club) is an online community about leaving the practice of medicine or science to pursue other careers. It includes job posts, networking events, and forums. As of 2017, there are more than 40,000 doctors, scientists, and students registered on the site. About half of the site's users are medical doctors, one-fourth are PhDs, and one-fourth have dual graduate degrees. There are members in more than 100 countries, but the site is most active in the United States, Canada, and the United Kingdom.

DOC began in 1999 as an informal in-person gathering among six former classmates from Columbia College of Physicians and Surgeons. Each former classmate had left the practice of medicine for another career. The in-person gatherings grew to more than 30 attendees, who often shared job opportunities. As the gatherings grew larger, two members created an online community for the group. Job listings were added to the site in 2008. By 2015, the site had 23,000 users. In 2016, DOC acquired Oystir, a career website for STEM PhD students, and merged it with DOC.
